Filipe Dominic Telo (born 4 March 1986) is a South African cricketer.

He signed with English county Derbyshire, on a two-year deal from the start of the 2008 summer. In August 2009 he was informed that his contract would not be renewed.

Telo is the coach of the United Arab Emirates at the 2020 Under-19 Cricket World Cup in his home country of South Africa.

External links

Evening Telegraph feature story
UAE captain Ahmed Raza excited by coaching role at U19 World Cup

1986 births
Living people
South African people of British descent
Cape Cobras cricketers
Western Province cricketers
Derbyshire cricketers
South African cricketers
Alumni of Wynberg Boys' High School